The following is a list of mayors of the city of Chortkiv, Ukraine. It includes positions equivalent to mayor, such as chairperson of the city council executive committee.

Mayors

Austrian period
 Leon Chekonsky, 1868-1870
 Johann Shattauer, 1870-1871
 Alfred Doshot, 1871-1874
 Anton Chachkovsky, 1875-1877
 Gersh Rosenzweit, 1878-1882
 , 1883, 1888-1913
 Ferdinand Klodnytsky, 1884-1887
 Isaac Mozler, 1913-1914
 , 1914
 Evstahiy Dudrovych, 1914-1917
 Isaac Mozler, 1917-1918

West Ukrainian People's Republic
 , 1918-1919

Second Polish Republic 
 Ignat Lisakovsky, 1920
 Ivan Tymkiv, 1921
 , 1928-1929
 Golinsky, 1930-1933
 Jerzy Sylwester Muszyński, 1934-1937
 Stanislav Severin Mikhalovsky, 1926-1937
 Jan Kachkowski, 1937
 , 1937

Third Reich 
 Julius Haas, 1942
 Gerhard Litschwager,  1941-1942
 , 1942-1944

USSR 
 Gregory Cheverda, 1944
 B. Zinenko, 1944
 Gregory Urasov, 1944-1945
 I. Kirichenko, 1945
 Boris Good, 1945-1946
 Ivan Sidorenko, 1946-1947
 Hilarion Pavlenko, 1947-1948
 Ivan Abramov, 1948
 Vasil Pasechko, 1948-1950
 Alexander Melnichuk, 1950-1951
 Ivan Samusev, 1951-1952
 A. Schlichok, 1952
 Solomon Glaser, 1952
 Lubomir Kuzyak, 1952-1955
 Dmitry Shapovalov, 1955-1958
 Catherine of Dovhopol, 1958-1959
 , 1959-1962
 Mykola Babenko, 1962-1965
 Alexander Busarov, 1965-1967
 Andriy Kagadiy, July 1966 – 1967
 Theodosius Ranchakowski, 1967-1971
 Yaroslav Smagliy, 1971-1974
 Vladimir Berezhnov, 1974-1977
 Omelyan Reshetar, 1977-1982
 Stepan Demyanchuk, 1982-1987
 Mikhail Verbitsky, 1987-1990, 2001-2006, 2010–2015

Ukraine 
 Bogdan Grechin, 1990-1997
 Yaroslav Stets, 1997-1998
 Vladimir Pavlishin, 1998-2000
 Maria Kuzyk, 2000-2001
 Igor Bilytsia, 2006-2010
 Vladimir Shmatko, 2015-

See also
 Chortkiv history
 Chronology of Chortkiv (in Ukrainian)
 Chortkiv City Hall (in Ukrainian)

References

This article incorporates information from the German Wikipedia, Polish Wikipedia, and Ukrainian Wikipedia.

History of Ternopil Oblast
Chortkiv